David Wands is Professor of Cosmology at the  Institute of Cosmology and Gravitation, in the University of Portsmouth.

He was educated at Dr Challoner's Grammar School, Amersham, and Gonville and Caius College, Cambridge, where he read Natural Sciences (Physical) and Mathematics. He received his PhD from the University of Sussex in 1994, supervised by Prof. John D. Barrow in the Astronomy Centre.

Wands has published numerous research papers on cosmology, the physics of the early universe and the origin of cosmic structure. Wands' research involves investigation of primordial fluctuations in the density and metric of spacetime. He proposed the curvaton model for the origin of cosmic structure, with David H. Lyth in 2001.

External links
Home Page
ICG Portsmouth
Research Papers

British cosmologists
Academics of the University of Portsmouth
Year of birth missing (living people)
Living people
21st-century British physicists
Alumni of the University of Sussex